Minjok  may refer to:

Minjok, which means "nation", "people", "ethnic group", "race", and "race-nation".
Korean nationalism and Korean ethnic nationalism
Minjok historiography, a hagiographic way of writing nationalistic Korean history
Uriminzokkiri, a website of North Korea
Korean Minjok Leadership Academy, a high school in Gangwon Province, South Korea